Seyyed Hashem Hosseini Bushehri is an Iranian Twelver Shia cleric who was born in 1956 in Bandar-e Deyr, Bushehr province. Hosseini Bushehri is the representative of Bushehr province in the Assembly of Experts; he is also the Temporary Imam of Friday Prayer in Qom.

Life 
Seyyed Hashem Hosseini Bushehri was born in Bordkhun, locating around Bandar-e Deyr in Bushehr province. His father was a cleric and farmer. His mother was the daughter of an Islamic Shia scholar. Hosseini Bushehri went to Hawzah after passing his elementary school. He began his seminary education at the Hawzah-school of Bushehr, and then went to Qom Seminary.

Teachers 
Hosseini Bushehri studied under teachers and scholars including:
 Mohammad-Reza Golpaygani
 Mohammad Fazel Lankarani
 Jawad Tabrizi
 Mirza Hashem Amoli
 Naser Makarem Shirazi
 Hossein Wahid Khorasani
 Hassan Hassanzadeh Amoli
 Mohammad Taqi Sotudeh
 Mirza Mohsen Duzduzani
 Amad Payani
 Yahya Ansari Shirazi

Works 
Among the works of Hosseini Bushehri are:
 Al-Qavaeed Al-Feqhieh Fi Feqhe Al-Imamieh
 Adab Nameye Parsayan
 Hadise Iman
 Sharhi Bar Ketabe Ijtehad Va Taqlide Orvatol Vosqa
 Sharhe Arabi Bar Ketabe Osule Feqh
 Taqrirate Doruse Feqh Va Osul

See also 
 Gholam Ali Safai Bushehri

References 

1956 births
Members of the Assembly of Experts
Shia clerics
People from Bushehr
Living people